Christiansø Fortress is one of the historic  Norwegian fortresses, which commands the western approaches to Flekkerøy harbor, at Kristiansand municipality in Norway.

History

In the early 17th century the struggle between the Netherlands Navy and the Dunkirk pirates had spread into Norwegian coastline waters in the South of Norway (Sørlandet). 

In June 1635 Christian IV of Denmark-Norway, in his vessel which lay at anchor at Flekkerøy harbor, ordered construction of a naval base and Christiansø Fortress on small Slottsholmen island (now called Gammeløen or old island). The island commands the western approaches to Flekkerøy harbor, a port long frequented by ships of many nations. 
The town of Kristiansand was also soon founded there in 1641 to strengthen control of the area. Flekkerøy lies off the coast of the population center at Kristiansand and is a part of Kristiansand municipality.

Christian IV again visited Flekkerøy in 1644 during the Hannibal War. 

While the Dutch-English war (1652–1654) was being fought Jørgen Bjelke was named lord of the region and commander of Christiansø Fortress to strengthen the defenses in the event that Oliver Cromwell's forces should attempt to seize it to prey on the extensive Dutch-Norwegian trade. Bjelke was later to play a major role in the Northern War. 

Construction on the fortress was never completed. When the danger from Cromwell ceased, this fort was abandoned and replaced by the more strategically located Fredriksholm Fortress, which commanded both approaches to the harbor, in 1658. 

The focus of defense moved to Kristiansand town in 1672, with the Christiansholm Fortress, much of which still survives.

During the Dano-German War of 1848 and through the Crimean War the forts at Christiansø and Fredriksholm were returned to service. The two islands were evacuated and the fortifications closed in 1871.

Although centuries old, the fortresses at Flekkerøy did not see combat until the German invasion on the 9th of April, 1940.

References
Trelastnæringen under Christian 4.  av Øystein Rian, Foreningen til Norske Fortidsninnesmerkers Bevaring Årbok 1988
South Norway by Frank Noel Stagg, George, Allen & Unwin, Ltd. 1958

Forts in Norway
Fortifications of Kristiansand